is a municipality in Agder county, Norway. It is located in the traditional district of Lister. The administrative centre of the municipality is the town of Flekkefjord. The villages of Sira, Gyland, Rasvåg, Kirkehavn, and Åna-Sira are located in Flekkefjord.

Flekkefjord is the westernmost municipality of the geographical region of Sørlandet. Flekkefjord is approximately midway between the cities of Kristiansand and Stavanger, located along European route E39 and the Sørlandet Line.

The  municipality is the 198th largest by area out of the 356 municipalities in Norway. Flekkefjord is the 121st most populous municipality in Norway with a population of 9,048.

General information
The small town of Flekkefjord was established as a municipality on 1 January 1838 (see formannskapsdistrikt law). In 1942, a part of the municipality of Nes (population: 377) was transferred to the town of Flekkefjord. On 1 January 1965, there was a major municipal merger due to the work of the Schei Committee. On that date, the rural municipalities of Bakke (except the Øksendal area), Gyland, Hidra, and Nes were merged with the town of Flekkefjord, creating a new, much larger municipality of Flekkefjord with about 8,800 people. On 1 January 1987, the Virak and Espetveit areas of northern Flekkefjord (population: 41) were transferred to Sirdal municipality.

Name
The municipality (and town) is named after the local fjord called the Flekkefjorden. The fjord is named after the old Flikka farm that is located near the fjord. The meaning of the name is unknown.

Coat of arms
The coat of arms for Flekkefjord are rather old (compared with most Norwegian municipal arms). They were granted around the year 1855. The arms were originally proposed in 1855 and they were described as a pilot boat on the sea. The original proposal showed a boat on a very natural sea, all in natural colours. The present shape of the boat and the more heraldically correct arms date from 1899.

Churches
The Church of Norway has four parishes within the municipality of Flekkefjord. It is part of the Lister og Mandal prosti (deanery) in the Diocese of Agder og Telemark.

Geography
The municipality is located in southwestern Agder county, along the border with Rogaland county and the North Sea to the southwest. It is bounded by Sokndal and Lund municipalities (in Rogaland county) to the west across the river Sira, by Sirdal municipality to the north, and by Kvinesdal municipality to the east.

The town of Flekkefjord is located near the southern coast of the municipality in a fjord. It straddles the narrow sound which connects the Flekkefjorden to Grisefjorden. The port is ideal due to the tiny difference in tides experienced here. This is a result of its close proximity to the amphidromic point outside Eigersund.

The lakes Kumlevollvatnet, Lundevatn, Selura, and Sirdalsvatnet are located in Flekkefjord. The southern coast is dominated by the Listafjorden and Fedafjorden with the large inhabited islands of Hidra and Andabeløyna lying in the Listafjorden.

Climate

History

Flekkefjord was a landing place from early times. It was mentioned as a town as early as 1580. In 1589, James VI of Scotland landed there before travelling overland via Tønsberg to Oslo, where he married Princess Anne of Denmark, daughter of Frederick II. When Kristiansand was founded in 1641, Christian IV wanted to assure the economic survival of his new city by moving Flekkefjord residents there. Twice it was sentenced to extinction by royal decree. But many of the Flekkefjord inhabitants remained and continued to trade.

Norway's plentiful stone was a Flekkefjord commodity. In 1736 over 300 Dutch ships are reported to have carried paving stones from Flekkefjord. By 1750 the herring fishery began in earnest, such that herring and timber dominated the trade. In the 1750s Flekkefjord was the most important Norwegian herring export harbor.

In 1760 Flekkefjord petitioned Frederik V to grant a town charter. At that time several ships were home ported there and both sailors and herring fishermen had their homes in this small town that was not officially recognized. Barrel making (cooperage) was also an important local trade that served the fishing fleet.

During the Napoleonic Wars Flekkefjord found a new life as a smugglers port, exporting oak to the Napoleon-occupied Netherlands during the period prior to 1807. The unusual tidal condition, the local timber abundance, and a long-term relationship with the Dutch were the reasons behind Flekkefjord's then serving as a smuggler's headquarters. They specialized in the lucrative oak trade, the warship timber in those days. Ships could come and leave Flekkefjord at any hour of the day, without concern for the tides.

Prior to 1807, Denmark-Norway had followed a policy of armed neutrality, using its naval forces only to protect trade flowing within, into, and out of Danish and Norwegian waters. But this changed for the last phase of the Napoleonic Wars when, in the Battle of Copenhagen in 1807, the British preemptively captured large portions of the Danish naval fleet to prevent the French from doing the same. As a result, the Danish government declared war and built small gunboats in large numbers to attack the British. The Gunboat War (1807–1814) was the title given to naval conflict between Denmark-Norway against the British navy. It was natural for Flekkefjord to move from a smuggler's haven to blockade runner's headquarters. The unusual tides there were unknown to the British warships that were blockading the Norwegian coast against Napoleon-supporting ships and this provided the blockade runners a considerable advantage.

After the war the Dutch maintained a strong presence in Flekkefjord, and continued exporting oak and pine. The pine was used mainly to make foundations for the boom in Amsterdam house construction; as a result most of Amsterdam's houses from the 19th century are constructed of pines from Flekkefjord exporters. A section of Flekkefjord called ‘Hollenderbyen’ (town of the Dutch) dates from the 18th century.

Xenotime, a rare yttrium phosphate mineral whose chemical formula is YPO4, was discovered in 1832 at Hidra (Hitterø), Flekkefjord.

The herring fisheries deserted the coast in 1838, depriving Flekkefjord residents of their main export. Tanning replaced fishing and by 1866 five tanneries were operating in Flekkefjord.

The Flekkefjord Line railway ran between Sira and Flekkefjord from 1904 to 1990.

Flekkefjord and nearby areas are served by Sørlandet Hospital Flekkefjord that covers population needs for surgery, orthopedics, oncology, gynecology and obstetrics.

Government

All municipalities in Norway, including Flekkefjord, are responsible for primary education (through 10th grade), outpatient health services, senior citizen services, unemployment and other social services, zoning, economic development, and municipal roads. The municipality is governed by a municipal council of elected representatives, which in turn elect a mayor.  The municipality falls under the Agder District Court and the Agder Court of Appeal.

Municipal council
The municipal council of Flekkefjord is made up of 35 representatives that are elected to four year terms. Currently, the party breakdown is as follows:

Parliamentary representation
After Flekkefjord acquired market town status in 1842, it also became a constituency for elections to the Parliament of Norway. The first representative was elected in 1845: Gerhard Heiberg Garmann. He served for three years before Nils Elias Børresen was elected. He served until 1863, when deputy Johan Andreas Kraft took over for one year. Knud Geelmuyden Fleischer Maartmann served from 1865 to 1866 and 1868 to 1869, and Elias Didrichsen served from 1871 to 1888, interrupted by Thorvald Olsen who served from 1877 through 1879. Niels Eyde, Jakob Stang, Sivert Hanssen-Sunde and Hans Sivert Jacobsen served one three-year term each between 1889 and 1900. Then, Cornelius Bernhard Hanssen served from 1900 to 1921, interrupted by Bernhard Severin Sannerud in the years 1916 through 1918. A law change in 1919 repelled Flekkefjord as a constituency of its own; from then it was a part of the combined constituency Market towns of Vest-Agder and Rogaland counties.

Mayors
Mayors in Flekkefjord typically served for one year from the start of local government in 1837. Of the notable early mayors were Jens Henrik Beer (Parliament member before Flekkefjord became its own constituency) in 1840 and Anders Beer in 1843. Many of the parliamentarians served as mayors: J. A. Kraft in 1842, 1858 and 1859; Børresen in 1846, 1849, 1850, 1852 and 1862; Didrichsen from 1853 to 1857, 1863 to 1870, 1878 to 1879 and 1883 to 1888; Jacobsen in 1889; Hanssen-Sunde from 1893 to 1899; Sannerud from 1906 to 1909 and in 1917; and C. B. Hanssen in 1933, 1936 and 1937.

Twin towns – sister cities

Flekkefjord is twinned with:

 Bollnäs, Sweden (1950)
 Burntisland, Scotland, UK (1946)
 Elbow Lake, United States (1973)
 Kankaanpää, Finland (1950)
 Misburg-Anderten (Hanover), Germany (1971)
 Morsø, Denmark (1950)

Notable residents

 Jens Henrik Beer Sr. (1731–1808) a ship-owner, sawmill owner and merchant
 Jens Henrik Beer (1799–1881), ship-owner, sawmill owner, farmer and politician
 Anders Beer (1801–1863) a Norwegian ship-owner, tanner and agriculturalist
 Marie Aarestrup (1826–1919), painter, specialized in genre and portrait painting
 Peter Waage (1833–1900), chemist and academic, developed the law of mass action
 Anders Beer Wilse (1865–1949), photographer of natural sceneries and people at work 
 Marta Steinsvik (1877–1950), author, promoted  women's rights, Nynorsk and theology 
 Gudmund Seland (1907–1996) a Norwegian resistance member and Mayor of Nes
 Nils Fuglesang (1918–1944) a Norwegian Supermarine Spitfire pilot, escaped from Stalag Luft III, recaptured and shot
 Gunvald Tomstad (1918–1970) a major agent of the British SIS and resistance member
 Bitten Modal, (Norwegian Wiki) (1940–2008), journalist, writer and feminist
 Kåre Drangsholt (1941–1983), boat designer and major boat manufacturer, Draco boats
 Sverre Anker Ousdal (born 1944), actor 
 Eva Lundgren (born 1947) a Norwegian-Swedish sociologist, re. violence against women
 Arnfinn Moland (born 1951) a Norwegian historian, long jumper and triple jumper
 Tove Pettersen (born 1962 on Hidra) a Norwegian feminist philosopher
 Boye Brogeland (born 1973) a Norwegian professional bridge player

Sport 
 Olaf Søyland (born 1952) a sprint canoer, competed at the 1976 Summer Olympics
 Einar Rasmussen (born 1956) a sprint canoeist, medallist at several World Championships
 Svein Egil Solvang (born 1968) a sprint canoer, competed at the 1988 Summer Olympics
 Anne Tønnessen (born 1974) a footballer, team gold medallist at the 2000 Summer Olympics
 Eirik Verås Larsen (born 1976) a Norwegian sprint kayaker, medallist at three Olympics

See also
Flekkefjord Dampskipsselskap
Flekkefjords Budstikke

References

External links

Municipal fact sheet from Statistics Norway 
Municipal website 
Map of Flekkefjord

 
Municipalities of Agder
1838 establishments in Norway